eMonocot is a collaborative global, online, biodiversity information resource provided by a number of botanical organisations to create a database on Monocotyledons. Participating institutions, all in England, are the Royal Botanical Gardens at Kew, the University of Oxford, the Natural History Museum and the Natural Environment Research Council (NERC).

Funding of the project which includes information on over 250,000 taxa is provided through NERC. Taxonomists from around the world contribute data, although the backbone of the resource is the World Checklist of Selected Plant Families. Data is imported and compiled from a large number of international databases and resources.

References

External links 
 Developing Tools for Mapping & Identification of Monocotyledons (eMonocot). Biodiversity Institute of Oxford
 eMonocot – a web taxonomic resource for plants of new scale and depth. RBG Kew
 eMonocot: The Orders and Families of Monocots
 UK Research and Innovation

Biodiversity
Biodiversity databases
Databases in England
Monocots
Natural Environment Research Council